Franco P. Marquicias (17 December 1905 – 20 April 1982) was a Filipino basketball player. He was a member of the Philippine team to the 1936 Berlin Olympics, a national player several times and one of the best known Filipino cager ever developed.

The late Franco Marquicias was also a member of the 1927 Philippine quintet that snagged the Far Eastern Olympic Championship in Shanghai, the 1934 Philippine team that copped the Olympic championship in Manila and the 1936 team that placed fifth in the 11th Olympiad held in Berlin, Germany, the highest the Philippines ever placed in an Olympic basketball competition. His later years saw him as a playing coach for Heacock and mentored his team to a worthy runner-up finish in the MICAA tournament.

During the ceremonies in the 1976 Montreal Olympics, Marquicias became a recipient of a citation award by the International Federation of Amateur Basketball.

References

External links
 

Basketball players at the 1936 Summer Olympics
Olympic basketball players of the Philippines
Philippines men's national basketball team players
Filipino men's basketball players
1905 births
1982 deaths